Benedikt "Bene" Mayr (born 14 March 1989) is a German freestyle skier. He was a participant at the 2014 Winter Olympics in Sochi.

References

External links 
 
 
 

1989 births
Living people
German male freestyle skiers
Olympic freestyle skiers of Germany
Freestyle skiers at the 2014 Winter Olympics
Audi Sport TT Cup drivers
21st-century German people